Nathaniel Tomkins (baptised 25 October 1584 - 5 July 1643) was a British Member of Parliament. He represented Carlisle and Christchurch.

Tomkins was born the son of the rector in Harpole, Northamptonshire and attended Magdalen College, Oxford. He obtained his BA in 1602 and MA three years later. It was in Oxford when he met Sir John Digby. The latter took notice of him and then made him the tutor of his oldest son. No doubt it was  Digby, who had influence at Court, provided Tomkins with a pension of £102 per year in 1613 and the next year during his visit to London Digby arranged Tomkins' return for Carlisle defending the queen's interest.

He represented Carlisle in Parliament from 1614 to 1620, when he was replaced by Sir Henry Vane, before being returned for the seat of Christchurch the following year. He briefly represented Ilchester in 1624, before handing the seat over to his brother-in-law, Edmund Waller and sitting again for Christchurch. Tomkins was appointed clerk to the duchy of Cornwall Council in 1625. But when he returned to the duchy borough of St. Mawes he preferred to sit for Christchurch on 11 July 1625. He continued to represent Christchurch until 1629. In 1628 he served as a clerk to Queen Henrietta Maria’s Council.

In 1643, Tomkins was implicated in "Waller's Plot", an attempt to force an armed rising against Parliament during the English Civil War. He was arrested and hanged outside his home on Fetter Lane on 5 July 1643, aged 58.

References

1584 births
1643 deaths
Alumni of Magdalen College, Oxford
English MPs 1614
English MPs 1621–1622
English MPs 1624–1625
English MPs 1626
English MPs 1628–1629